Manuel Elías Bonnemaison Torres (Lima, March 27, 1862 – February 17, 1961) was a Peruvian sailor and ambassador. He was the last survivor of the battle of Angamos.

Early life
Manuel Elías Bonnemaison Torres was the son of Gumercinda Torres and Juan Elías Bonnemaison, an engineer. He married Paulina Tarnassi, having children.

Military career
He was a student at the Naval School, where he studied until obtaining the rank of Midshipman in 1879. He participated in the naval campaign of the War of the Pacific.

Embarked in the Huáscar, as an aspiring navy, he attended all the Huáscar raids up to the Naval Combat of Angamos. After Angamos, he remained a prisoner in Chile until January 1880. Returning to active service, he embarked on the capture of the steamer Rímac, assisting in the bombing of Callao and commanding the launches "Amo", "Urcos" and "Independencia". When the defense of Lima began, he was transferred to "El Pino" Hill, as head of the southern battery, attending the Battle of Miraflores.

Diplomatic career
Years after the war, he studied engineering in Switzerland and served in the Peruvian legation in London. From 1904 to 1921 he was consul general in Buenos Aires and in 1929 minister plenipotentiary in China and Japan. From June 2, 1925 to August 9, 1929, he was Envoy Extraordinary and Minister Plenipotentiary in La Paz. In 1945 he was consul general second class in New Orleans.

In the last years of his life he was honored as the last survivor of Angamos, and due to him being a witness of the battle, he was considered as a primary source, although details were later found to be erroneous. He inaugurated the monument to his superior, Miguel Grau, in the square named after him in the centre of Lima.

See also
Miguel Grau

References

1862 births
1961 deaths
People from Lima
Ambassadors of Peru to China
Ambassadors of Peru to Japan
Ambassadors of Peru to Bolivia
Peruvian military personnel of the War of the Pacific